Thomas Horsten (born 5 January 1994) is a Dutch footballer who plays as a midfielder for UNA.

Career
Horsten made his professional debut for Jong PSV, the second team of PSV Eindhoven, in the Eerste Divisie, the Dutch second tier, on 3 August 2013 against Sparta Rotterdam.

Ahead of the 2019–20 season, Horsten joined VV UNA.

References

1994 births
Living people
Dutch footballers
Dutch expatriate footballers
Association football midfielders
PSV Eindhoven players
Jong PSV players
Cavese 1919 players
FC Eindhoven players
SV TEC players
VV UNA players
Derde Divisie players
Eerste Divisie players
Serie D players
Sportspeople from Heeze-Leende
Dutch expatriate sportspeople in Italy
Expatriate footballers in Italy
Footballers from North Brabant